Derry is an unincorporated community located in Sierra County, New Mexico, United States. Derry has a post office with ZIP code 87933, which opened on August 11, 1911. The town was named after Derry, Ireland, which was suggested by a former soldier.

Education
Truth or Consequences Municipal Schools is the school district for the entire county. Truth or Consequences Middle School and Hot Springs High School, both in Truth or Consequences, are the district's secondary schools.

References

Unincorporated communities in Sierra County, New Mexico
Unincorporated communities in New Mexico